7336 Saunders, provisional designation , is a stony asteroid and near-Earth object of the Amor group, approximately 0.5 kilometers in diameter.

The asteroid was discovered on 6 September 1989, by American astronomer Eleanor Helin at Palomar Observatory in California, United States. It was named for JPL-project scientist R. Stephen Saunders.

Orbit and classification 

Saunders orbits the Sun at a distance of 1.2–3.4 AU once every 3 years and 6 months (1,278 days). Its orbit has an eccentricity of 0.48 and an inclination of 7° with respect to the ecliptic.

A first precovery was taken at the Australian Siding Spring Observatory in 1982, extending the body's observation arc by 7 years prior to its official discovery at Palomar.

Physical characteristics 

In the SMASS classification, Saunders is a Sq-type, which transitions from the common S-type to the Q-type asteroids. The Collaborative Asteroid Lightcurve Link assumes a standard albedo for stony asteroids of 0.20 and derives a diameter of 467 meters, based on an absolute magnitude of 19.02.

Lightcurve 

In October 1989, the first photometric observations of Saunders were made with the ESO 1-metre telescope at La Silla in Chile. It gave a rotation period of 6 hours with a brightness variation of 0.3 magnitude.

Naming 

This minor planet was named in honor of JPL-project scientist R. Stephen Saunders (born 1940), director of the RPIF and head scientist of the Solar System Exploration Office. He worked on the Mars Surveyor 2001/03 program and on the Magellan spacecraft, that visited and mapped Venus in 1990. The official naming citation was published by the Minor Planet Center on 26 July 2000.

Notes

References

External links 
 Asteroid Lightcurve Database (LCDB), query form (info )
 Dictionary of Minor Planet Names, Google books
 Asteroids and comets rotation curves, CdR – Observatoire de Genève, Raoul Behrend
 
 
  
 

007336
Discoveries by Eleanor F. Helin
Named minor planets
007336
19890906